Tomás McGrane (born 22 September 1979) is an Irish hurler who played as a right corner-forward for the Dublin senior team.

McGrane made his first appearance for the team during a pre-season series of games in 1998 and was a regular member of the starting fifteen until his retirement after the 2006 National League.

At club level McGrane plays with St. Vincent's.

References

1979 births
Living people
St Vincents (Dublin) hurlers
Dublin inter-county hurlers